Scout is the only extended play (EP) by Canadian rock band Calpurnia. It was released on 15 June 2018 through Royal Mountain, Transgressive and paradYse. It was also the band's only release, as they disbanded a year afterwards.

Background 
Calpurnia signed to the Toronto-based independent record label Royal Mountain Records in November 2017, beginning recording an unnamed extended play, with Cadien Lake James from the American indie rock band, Twin Peaks. In January 2018, the band played at the Rough Trade shop in New York City, where they debuted "Louie", "Wasting Time", "Greyhound" and "City Boy" from the then-unannounced EP.

After releasing the second single, "Louie", in April 2018, the band officially announced Scout and its release date.

Promotion

Singles and music videos 
The lead single from the EP, "City Boy", was released on 7 March 2018. The music video, released simultaneously, was shot and edited by Josiah Marshall, showing the band in a recording session. The second single, "Louie", was released on 12 April, along with an animated music video by Jason Bartell.
On 18 May Calpurnia released "Greyhound".

Rough Trade exclusive 
Rough Trade released a limited-edition 7" single, "Greyhound/Louie", on 18 May 2018. The single contained "Greyhound", as well as the songs "Louie" and "Waves".

Track listing

Release history

References 

2018 debut EPs
Calpurnia (band) albums
Transgressive Records albums
EPs by Canadian artists